"Museum Piece" is the second episode in the first series of the British comedy series Dad's Army. It was originally transmitted on 7 August 1968.

Synopsis
Mainwaring and Wilson come up with an idea for getting the platoon some much needed weapons: "Operation Gun Grab". The plan is to requisition any firearms from the local museum of Historic Army Weapons – but to do so the platoon must first find a way to outwit the 88-year-old caretaker, who happens to be the father of Lance Corporal Jones.

Plot
It is not long after the platoon's first parade, and Mainwaring and Wilson discuss a recent exercise which involved crossing a 'demolished bridge' to cross a river. However, Pike fell in, flat on his face. Mainwaring confides in Wilson that he doesn't think he has the unthinking obedience required to make an efficient fighting unit, and is sure that one of his men told him to "get stuffed".

Wilson asks Mainwaring about the weapons situation, and Mainwaring reluctantly informs him that it will be a further six weeks before the weapons and uniforms arrive, so they must make do with one shotgun, seventeen carving knives, Jones' assegai, and Bracewell's number three iron. They receive a letter from the Peabody Museum of Historical Army Weapons, informing them that they'll have to close their account for the duration because the curator has joined the navy.

Mainwaring's ears prick up at the name of the museum, and deduces they might be able to use some equipment that could be used by his Local Defence Volunteers. Wilson isn't so sure, but Mainwaring organises "Operation Gun Grab", and tells Miss King to write a letter to give to the caretaker in charge.

On parade, Jones informs Mainwaring that he won't be able to get anything from the museum, because the caretaker in charge is Jones' 88-year-old father. True to form, the cantankerous old man refuses to let the platoon in, so they decide to try force, using scaling ladders and battering rams, but to no avail. When they try to scale the museum, George Jones puts a damper on their plans by soaking them in cold water.

Mainwaring decides to take a more tactical approach, and Jones says a bottle of whisky will do the trick.  Walker gives Frazer, who will be disguised as an ARP Warden, the bottle to tempt him with, if he doesn't respond to Frazer's insistence that there's a light showing.

All goes well, and the platoon sneak into the museum. Jones finds a halberd and breastplate, Pike and Walker find an elephant-shooting musket, and Godfrey finds a case of .303 carbines, which are being used by ENSA. The platoon prepare to leave, defeated, until Jones and Walker find a Chinese rocket gun, and wheel it back to the church hall.

Their driver, a boy scout is asked by Jones and Walker to try to get it going. Mainwaring calls the duo over and says that he praises their initiative, but the weapon is too antiquated – even for them. As they prepare to make petrol bombs, the boy scout gets the weapon working, and it fires rockets everywhere.

Cast

Arthur Lowe as Captain Mainwaring
John Le Mesurier as Sergeant Wilson
Clive Dunn as Lance Corporal Jones
John Laurie as Private Frazer
James Beck as Private Walker
Arnold Ridley as Private Godfrey
Ian Lavender as Private Pike
Janet Davies as Mrs Pike
Caroline Dowdeswell as Janet King
Leon Cortez as Henry, the Milkman
Eric Woodburn as George Jones, the Museum Caretaker
Michael Osborne as Boy Scout

Filming
The exterior scenes at the museum were filmed at Oxburgh Hall, a National Trust property in Norfolk.

References

External links

Dad's Army radio episodes
Dad's Army (series 1) episodes
1968 British television episodes